The following human polls made up the 2021 NCAA Division I women's softball rankings.  The NFCA/USA Today Poll was voted on by a panel of 32 Division I softball coaches. The NFCA/USA Today poll, the Softball America poll, the ESPN.com/USA Softball Collegiate rankings, and D1Softball ranked the top 25 teams nationally.

Legend

NFCA/USA Today

ESPN.com/USA Softball Collegiate Top 25

D1Softball

Softball America

Source:

References

Rankings
College softball rankings in the United States